The American Fork (commonly known as the American Fork River) is a river in Utah County, Utah, United States.

Description
The unnamed stream, which is the source of the American Fork, flows from Mineral Basin, through the length of the American Fork Canyon and has several named tributaries (Silver Creek, Deer Creek, and Cattle Creek). The river runs through northern Utah County and empties into Utah Lake on its north shore.

The city of American Fork is named after this river.
The description "American" in the river's name is to distinguish it from the Spanish Fork (river) that also originates in the Wasatch Range; alternatively, it could have been named after the American Fur Company.

Fly fishermen commonly target smaller rainbow trout (measuring 6–12 in.) – and to a lesser extent brown trout – in the river during summer and fall, when strong runoff and snowfall do not limit access.

In addition to fish, a rich community of mayflies, stoneflies, and caddisflies is also present in the American Fork river.

Groundwater contribution of metals to the river
The abandoned Pacific Mine adjacent to the North Fork of the river has been a source of metals that enter the river when it is gaining stream.  Spill events contributing toxic metals to the river have deemed waters dangerous to humans at times,  but work has also been done by the U.S. Forest Service to remove tailings from mining sites.

See also

 List of rivers of Utah

References

External links

Rivers of Utah
Wasatch Front
Rivers of Utah County, Utah
Tributaries of Utah Lake